Norving A/S was a regional airline that operated in Norway between 1971 and 1993. It had roots back to the establishment of Varangfly in 1959. At its peak, the company had eight bases and 27 aircraft.

History
Varangfly was founded on 24 July 1959 by Bjarne Zakariassen, Bjørn Rist and Odd Bentzen. In 1971, the company merged with Tromsø-based Nor-Wings, and the following year it bought Bodø-based Nordlandsfly. At that time the airline was renamed Norving. With the take-over, Norving had ambulance aircraft covering all of Northern Norway.

With the construction of the regional airports in Western Troms and in Finnmark, Norving competed to get the concession for subsidies from the Ministry of Transport. The government chose instead to grant the concession to Widerøe, who had been operating the other parts of the regional airports in Western and Northern Norway.

Norving continued to work for more regional airports in Finnmark, and was instrumental in establishing them in Berlevåg, Båtsfjord, Gamvik, Hasvik and Kjøllefjord. During the 1980s, Norving made a massive expansion into Southern Norway, and tried to capture concessions for routes feeding the regional airport to the large cities. In particular, the airline established itself at Skien Airport, Geiteryggen, Geilo Airport, Dagali, Fagernes Airport, Leirin, Sandefjord Airport, Torp, Stord Airport, Sørstokken and Hamar Airport, Stafsberg. However, Norving could not make enough revenue to make a profit, and was forced to massively close down routes. At the most, the company had eight bases and 27 aircraft. By 1989, there was only two bases and four planes still in operation, before the company filed for bankruptcy in 1993. Subsidized routes in Northern Norway were taken over by Widerøe.

Fleet

Through its history, Norving operated the following aircraft:

Destinations
Destinations served by Norving:
Alta (Alta Airport)
Bergen (Bergen Airport, Flesland)
Berlevåg (Berlevåg Airport)
Båtsfjord (Båtsfjord Airport)
Fagernes (Fagernes Airport, Leirin)
Hamar (Hamar Airport, Stafsberg)
Hammerfest (Hammerfest Airport)
Hasvik (Hasvik Airport)
Haugesund (Haugesund Airport, Karmøy)
Honningsvåg (Honningsvåg Airport, Valan)
Kirkenes (Kirkenes Airport, Høybuktmoen)
Kristiansand (Kristiansand Airport, Kjevik)
Mehamn (Mehamn Airport)
Molde (Molde Airport, Årø)
Oslo (Oslo Airport, Fornebu)
Sandefjord (Sandefjord Airport, Torp)
Skien  (Skien Airport, Geiteryggen)
Stord (Stord Airport, Sørstokken)
Tromsø (Tromsø Airport)
Trondheim (Trondheim Airport, Værnes)
Vadsø (Vadsø Airport)
Vardø (Vardø Airport, Svartnes)

References

Defunct airlines of Norway
Airlines established in 1971
Airlines disestablished in 1993
Companies based in Finnmark
Norwegian companies established in 1971
1993 disestablishments in Norway